The Central District of Tangestan County is in Bushehr province, Iran. At the 2006 census, its population was 35,259 in 8,134 households. The following census in 2011 counted 38,047 people in 9,948 households. At the latest census in 2016, the district had 40,157 inhabitants living in 11,593 households.

References 

Districts of Bushehr Province
Populated places in Tangestan County